Archives of Asian Art is an annual academic journal covering the arts of South, Southeast, Central, and East Asia. Each issue contains articles by scholars of art and a selection of outstanding works of Asian art acquired by North American museums during the previous year.

The journal was established in 1945 as the Archives of the Chinese Art Society of America. It obtained its current title with volume 20 in 1966. The journal is owned by the Asia Society, which in 2007 changed its publisher from Brepols to the University of Hawaii Press.

Volumes 1–55 (1945–2005) are available on JSTOR; recent volumes are available on Project MUSE.

External links 
 
 MUSE homepage
 Asian Society homepage

Annual journals
Asian studies journals
English-language journals
Publications established in 1946
Visual art journals